Rhamnopyranosyl-N-acetylglucosaminyl-diphospho-decaprenol beta-1,3/1,4-galactofuranosyltransferase (arabinogalactan galactofuranosyl transferase 1, GlfT1) is an enzyme with systematic name . This enzyme catalyses the following chemical reaction

 2 UDP-alpha-D-galactofuranose +   2 UDP +  (overall reaction)

(1a) UDP-alpha-D-galactofuranose +   UDP + 
(1b) UDP-alpha-D-galactofuranose +   UDP + 

This enzyme is isolated from Mycobacterium tuberculosis and M. smegmatis.

References

External links 

EC 2.4.1